Carolina Iglesias (Oleiros, August 8, 1993), also known as Percebes y Grelos, is a Spanish comedian, screenwriter, and YouTuber. In 2021, she was recognized with the Marcela and Elisa Award for her work in favor of LGTBI+, rights, being the youngest person to receive this award.

Trajectory 
In 2017, she began co-hosting Yu: No te pierdas nada, one of the star programs of the radio network Los 40, and has worked on programs such as Zapeando, Lo siguiente (the TVE program hosted by Raquel Sánchez Silva), on Operación Triunfo, Hora yutuber or Youtubers Live. She also starred in the Palacio de la Prensa in a theatrical show about the nostalgia of twenty-somethings called Que vuelva Fotolog together with the YouTuber Esty Quesada (Soy una pringada).

On September 18, 2019, she began to publish on her YouTube channel #UnaCañaCon, a space sponsored by Mahou in which she interviews artists. That same year, Iglesias hosted the XVII Mestre Mateo Awards along with Camila Bossa, David Amor, Xlio Abonjo, and Fernando Epelde.

Since May 2020, she has presented Estirando el chicle, a podcast created together with Victoria Martín that, although it began recording from their homes, was signed by Podium Podcast in its second season. Since its launch, in the midst of strict confinement (March–May) caused by the COVID-19 pandemic, it became one of the most listened to independent podcasts in Spain. Also in 2020, she premiered on YouTube, together with Victoria Martín Válidas, a webseries about two female comedians going through a bad time and who decide to pose as a couple to achieve social success. Iglesias and Martín wrote and starred in it.

In 2021, Iglesias began collaborating with Henar Álvarez in the weekly comedy segment Tarde lo que tarde on Radio Nacional de España.

Filmography

Programs

Series

Podcast

Awards 
In October 2021, Estirando el chicle by Iglesias and Victoria Martín, broadcast on Podium Podcast, received the Ondas Award for Best podcast or digital broadcasting program.

References 

Spanish LGBT people
Women humorists
Spanish YouTubers
Complutense University of Madrid alumni
Living people
1993 births